Jameh Mosque of Mehrabad is related to the Safavid dynasty and is located in Bonab, Mehrabad Square.

References

Mosques in East Azerbaijan Province
Mosque buildings with domes
National works of Iran
Mehrabad